The Illinois State University College of Fine Arts (Wonsook Kim College of Fine Arts) offers programs in art, music, theater, dance, and arts technology. The name of the college was officially changed to "Wonsook Kim College of Fine Arts" in recognition of a $12 million gift from artist and alum, Wonsook Kim.

School of Art
The art school at Illinois State University provides a professional education for students desiring careers in the visual arts.  The baccalaureate program provides students the opportunity to mentor with a faculty sponsor and to produce a professional solo exhibition prior to graduation. The master’s program provides visual artists the opportunity to work i toward their development as artists.

Accreditation
The National Association of Schools of Art and Design fully accredits the School of Art.

Undergraduate programs
 Art History
 Fine Arts
 Graphic Design
 Studio Arts
 Teacher Education

Graduate programs
 Fine Arts
 Art Education
 Visual Culture

School of Music
Illinois State University offers a variety of study programs within the spectrum of music. More than fifteen ensemble opportunities are available to all students on-campus, plus multiple chamber music ensembles, and musical theatre/opera productions. Admission to the program is through audition.  There are also private instruction opportunities taught by professors, not teaching assistants, on all wind, brass, and percussion instruments, as well as piano, voice, and strings, including classical guitar.

Accreditation
Illinois State is one of 593 schools of music accredited by the National Association of Schools of Music (NASM).

Undergraduate programs
 Band and Orchestral Instrument Performance
 Classical Guitar Performance
 Liberal Arts
 Music Business
 Music Composition
 Music Education
 Music Theater
 Music Therapy
 Keyboard Pedagogy and Performance
 Voice Performance

Graduate programs
 Collaborative Piano
 Music Composition
 Music Conducting
 Music Education: The summer’s only program in the graduate program in Music Education affords teachers the flexibility to complete a master’s.
 Music Performance
 Music Therapy

RED NOTE New Music Festival 
The annual RED NOTE New Music Festival at Illinois State University is a week-long event which features outstanding performances of contemporary concert music. Highlights of past seasons include appearances by Ensemble Mise-en, City of Tomorrow, Momenta Quartet, Orchid Ensemble, Fulcrum Point New Music Ensemble, Color Field Ensemble, Spektral Quartet, Del Sol Quartet, loadbang, and Ensemble Dal Niente. Featured guest composers have included Stephen Hartke, Steven Stucky, Joan Tower, Lee Hyla, Sydney Hodkinson, and Augusta Read Thomas. RED NOTE also holds an annual Composition Competition which brings in entries from around the world.

School of Theatre and Dance
The School of Theatre and Dance offers conservatory-level training within the context of a liberal arts education. Performance opportunities with Illinois State include the professional Illinois Shakespeare Festival, extensive main stage, second-stage and studio productions, plus student produced works. Admission to the Acting, Dance, and Dance Education sequences are through audition. Admission to the Design/Production sequence is through portfolio.

Undergraduate programs
 Acting
 Dance
 Dance Education
 Design/Production
 Theater Education
 Theater Studies

Graduate programs
 Master of Arts or Master of Science in Theater
 Master of Fine Arts in Theater
 Acting
 Costume Design
 Directing
 Lighting Design
 Scene Design

Program in Arts Technology
The Arts Technology Program integrates study across the arts with the study of digital technology. Students use digital media to explore areas of traditional creative art making in music, sound, still and moving imagery, and typography to express ideas and solve problems.  Admission to the Program in Arts Technology is through portfolio.

Undergraduate program
 Arts Technology

Graduate program
 Arts Technology

References

Illinois State University